HMS Gloucester was a 50-gun fourth-rate ship of the line built at Deptford by Joseph Allin the elder for the Royal Navy in 1710/11. She participated in the War of the Spanish Succession. The ship was burned to prevent capture after she was damaged in a storm during Commodore George Anson's voyage around the world in 1742.

Description
The ship's tonnage was 714  tons burthen. Gloucester was armed with twenty-two 18-pounder cannon on her main gundeck, twenty-two 9-pounder cannon on her upper gundeck, and four 6-pounder cannon each on the quarterdeck and forecastle. The ship had a crew of 185–280 officers and ratings.

Construction and career
Gloucester, named after the eponymous port, was the fourth ship of her name to serve in the Royal Navy. She was ordered on 29 July 1710 and was built by Master Shipwright Joseph Allin to the 1706 Establishment of dimensions at Deptford Dockyard. The ship was launched on 4 October 1711 and commissioned that same year under Captain James Carlton for service in the English Channel.

Gloucester was ordered to be dismantled to be rebuilt to the dimensions of the 1719 Establishment at Sheerness on 6 November 1724 and this was completed on 20 January 1725. The rebuilding was suspended until 22 May 1733 when the ship was reordered to the 1733 revisions; she was relaunched on 22 March 1737.

Fate
In 1742 Gloucester was damaged in a storm under Captain Matthew Michell, and she was burned in order to avoid her being captured.

Notes

References
 
 
 Winfield, Rif (2009) British Warships in the Age of Sail 1603–1714: Design, Construction, Careers and Fates. Barnsley, UK: Seaforth Publishing. .

External links
 

 

Ships of the line of the Royal Navy
1710s ships
Maritime incidents in 1742